Stanislas Wawrinka was the defending champion, but lost in the quarterfinals to Japanese qualifier Go Soeda.

Milos Raonic won the tournament beating top seeded Janko Tipsarević, 6–7(4–7), 7–6(7–4), 7–6(7–4).

Seeds
The top four seeds received a bye into the second round.

Draw

Finals

Top half

Bottom half

Qualifying

Seeds

Qualifiers

Lucky losers
  Édouard Roger-Vasselin

Draw

First qualifier

Second qualifier

Third qualifier

Fourth qualifier

References 
Main Draw
Qualifying Draw

Singles
2012 ATP World Tour
Maharashtra Open